Raymond Moore and Andrew Pattison won in the final 6–4, 5–7, 6–4 against Bob Hewitt and Frew McMillan.

Seeds

 Bob Hewitt /  Frew McMillan (final)
 Iván Molina /  Jairo Velasco, Sr. (first round)
 Vitas Gerulaitis /  Tom Gorman (quarterfinals)
 Raymond Moore /  Andrew Pattison (champions)

Draw

External links
 1974 Stadthalle Open Doubles draw

Doubles